The World Should Know may refer to:

 The World Should Know (Couse and the Impossible album), 2005
 The World Should Know (Burning Spear album), 1993